Body horror, biological horror, organic horror or visceral horror is horror fiction in which the horror is principally derived from the unnatural graphic transformation, degeneration or destruction of the physical body. Such works may deal with decay, disease, deformity, parasitism, mutation or mutilation. Other types of body horror include unnatural movements or the anatomically incorrect placement of limbs to create "monsters" from human body parts. David Cronenberg, Frank Henenlotter, Brian Yuzna, Stuart Gordon, Lloyd Kaufman, and Clive Barker are notable directors of this genre. The term body horror was coined with the "Body Horror" theme issue of the University of Glasgow film journal Screen (vol. 27, no. 1, January–February 1986), which contains several essays on the subject.

Notable films and television series

Notable writers

In his introduction to The Mammoth Book of Body Horror, the film director Stuart Gordon says that "Body Horror has been with us since long before there were movies". According to the summary of this anthology, the important writers of Body Horror are :

 Mary Shelley
 Edgar Allan Poe
 H. P. Lovecraft
 John W. Campbell
 George Langelaan
 Richard Matheson
 Stephen King
 Clive Barker
 Robert Bloch
 Ramsey Campbell
 Brian Lumley
 Nancy A. Collins
 Richard Christian Matheson
 Michael Marshall Smith
 Neil Gaiman
 James Herbert
 Christopher Fowler
 Alice Henderson
 Graham Masterton
 Gemma Files
 Simon Clark
 Barbie Wilde
 David Moody
 Axelle Carolyn
 Tony Vilgotsky
 H. G. Wells

But others names could be quoted, according to Xavier Aldana Reyes in his book Body Gothic :

 Poppy Z. Brite
 Kathe Koja
 Dennis Cooper
 Bret Easton Ellis

Notable graphic novels

Use in video games
In recent years, the subjects of human experimentation, medical research, and infection have played large roles in video games whose plots are heavily influenced by themes common in body horror.

Use in tabletop gaming

See also
 Biopunk
 New French Extremity
 New Gothic
 Psychological horror
 Organ transplantation in fiction

References

External links
 Inside Out: Body Horror
 Internet Movie Database films listed under keyword body-horror

Horror fiction lists
Body horror